Iranahatti is a village in Belagavi district in the southern state of Karnataka, India.
Is well known for Sri Yelumukha devi goddess temple. Every amavasya 8000 odd people visit this holy place and receive blessings of goddess irrespective of caste.

References

Villages in Belagavi district